Faizabad district, officially Ayodhya district, is one of the 75 districts of Indian state of Uttar Pradesh. The city of Ayodhya, which is believed to be the birth place of Hindu deity Rama, is the administrative headquarters of the district. The official name of the district was changed from Faizabad to Ayodhya in November 2018 by Yogi Adityanath-led Government of Uttar Pradesh. Awadhi is the common language of the people of Faizabad district.

Demographics

According to the 2011 Indian census, the district had a population of 2,470,996, of which males were 1,259,628 and females were 1,211,368. Population in the age group of 0–6 years was 360,082. This gave it a ranking of 178th in India (out of a total of 640). Its population growth rate over the decade 2001-2011 was 18.16%. The district had a sex ratio of 961 females for every 1000 males. The total number of literates in the district were 1,450,901, which constitutes 58.7% of the population. The effective literacy rate of 7+ population was 70.63%. Scheduled Castes made up 22.46% of the population.

At the time of the 2011 Census of India, 83.00% of the population in the district spoke Hindi, 13.50% Awadhi and 3.14% Urdu as their first language.

Politics
Faizabad district has one Lok Sabha constituency and 5 Vidhan Sabha constituencies. Lallu Singh  from Bharatiya Janata Party is the MP of Faizabad Lok Sabha constituency in Uttar Pradesh.

And in the last 2022 assembly elections, the BJP has won 3 seats and Samajwadi Party has won 2 seats from  the five assembly seats in this district. Ved Prakash Gupta (BJP) is the MLA from Ayodhya Assembly constituency, Ram Chandra Yadav (BJP) from Rudauli Assembly constituency, Awadesh Prasad (Samajwadi Party) won from Milkipur Assembly constituency, Amit Singh Chauhan (BJP) from Bikapur Assembly constituency and Abhay Singh (Samajwadi Party) is the MLA from Goshainganj Assembly constituency.

Police stations
There are 19 Police stations in Faizabad district.

1.Kotwali Ayodhya 2.Inayat Nagar
3.Cantt. 4.Kumarganj 5.Kotwali Nagar 6.Khandasa 7.Gosainganj 8.Tarun 9.Patranga 10.Pura Kalandar 11.Kotwali Bikapur 12.Mawai 13.Maharajganj 14.Mahila Thana 15.Rudauli 16.Ram Janm Bhumi
17.Raunahi 18.Haiderganj 19.Baba Bazar (newly created 2022).

Transport

By Rail
The major railway stations in the district are
 Ayodhya Junction
 Faizabad Junction (Ayodhya Cantt Jn)
 Rudauli railway station
 Goshainganj railway station

By Air
Ayodhya Airport (under construction) is the international airport in Ayodhya, Uttar Pradesh.

Education
 Avadh University, later renamed the Dr. Ram Manohar Lohia Avadh University, was established in Faizabad in 1975.
 Acharya Narendra Deva University of Agriculture and Technology is a university situated in Kumarganj.
 K.S. Saket P.G. College is a degree college situated in Ayodhya city.

References

External links

 Faizabad city website
 Former Faizabad district website

 
Districts of Uttar Pradesh
Faizabad division